In mathematics, Gelfand–Fuks cohomology, introduced in , is a cohomology theory for Lie algebras of smooth vector fields.  It differs from the Lie algebra cohomology of Chevalley-Eilenberg in that its cochains are taken to be continuous multilinear alternating forms on the Lie algebra of smooth vector fields where the latter is given the  topology.

References

Further reading 

Cohomology theories
Lie algebras
Homological algebra